Davor Blažević (born 7 February 1993) is a Swedish footballer who plays as a goalkeeper for Hammarby IF in Allsvenskan.

Early life
Blažević was born in Falun, Sweden, to parents from Bosnia and Herzegovina. He grew up in Södertälje and started playing football with local club Assyriska FF as a youngster, before joining the academy of IF Brommapojkarna in 2005.

Club career

Brommapojkarna
In 2010, Blažević was promoted to Brommapojkarna's first team in Allsvenskan, acting as a back-up to Kristoffer Nordfeldt when the club was relegated from the top tier.

In 2011, Blažević made his senior debut for Brommapojkarna in Superettan, Sweden's second division, making two league appearances. In 2012, he played two league games as Brommapojkarna secured a promotion, finishing 2nd in the Superettan table. Blažević was sidelined throughout the whole 2013 season, due to a cruciate ligament injury.

In 2014, Blažević played 18 league games for Brommapojkarna in Allsvenskan, although the club finished 16th and last in the table, only claiming 12 points in 30 games. Blažević also competed with Brommapojkarna in the 2014–15 UEFA Europa League, eliminating VPS and Crusaders in the first two qualifying rounds. He featured in both legs against the Serie A side  Torino in the third qualifying round, when the club was eliminated through 0–7 on aggregate.

In 2015, Brommapojkarna suffered a second consecutive relegation, finishing 16th and last in the Superettan table. Blazevic made 18 league appearances throughout the campaign, but left the club at the end of the year.

AFC and Assyriska
In April 2016, Blažević was close to joining Jönköpings Södra in Superettan due to an emergency crisis, but the deal fell through after the Swedish Football Association did not grant an exemption outside of the transfer window.

On 2 August 2016, Blažević joined AFC United. He acted as a back-up to Josh Wicks during the second half of the season, as the club finished 2nd in Superettan and won a promotion to Allsvenskan.

On 20 March 2017, Blažević returned to his youth club Assyriska FF, competing in the third tier Ettan. He only made nine league appearances for the side, that finished mid-table, and left at the end of the year.

Hammarby IF
On 14 February 2018, after a successful trial, Blažević signed a short term-deal with Hammarby IF in Allsvenskan. On 25 June the same year, he signed a new one and half-year contract with the club. He played the last five league games of the season, after first choice goalkeeper Johan Wiland went under the knife due to a shoulder injury.

In 2019, Blažević mainly served as a backup to both Gianluca Curci and Johan Wiland, but still ended the season making 13 league appearances in total. With Blažević between the sticks, Hammarby made a strong finish to the season (with five straight wins between match day 25 and 30) and ultimately finished 3rd in the Allsvenskan table. On 25 October the same year, Blažević signed a new three-year contract with Hammarby, running until the end of 2022.

On 24 March 2021, Blažević was sent on a three-month loan to GIF Sundsvall in Superettan, Sweden's second tier.

Blažević featured in the final of the 2021–22 Svenska Cupen, in which Hammarby lost by 4–5 on penalties to Malmö FF after the game ended in a 0–0 draw. On 13 September 2022, Blažević signed a new three-year contract with Hammarby, with an option for a further.

Career statistics

Club

References

External links

1993 births
Living people
Swedish footballers
Sweden youth international footballers
Sweden under-21 international footballers
Swedish people of Bosnia and Herzegovina descent
Allsvenskan players
Superettan players
Ettan Fotboll players
IF Brommapojkarna players
AFC Eskilstuna players
Assyriska FF players
Hammarby Fotboll players
GIF Sundsvall players
Association football goalkeepers
Gröndals IK players
People from Falun
Sportspeople from Dalarna County